Coleophora citrarga is a moth of the family Coleophoridae. It is found in Japan (Honshu island) and Taiwan.

The wingspan is 9–10 mm.

References

citrarga
Moths of Asia